A sail is any type of surface intended to move a vessel, vehicle or rotor by being placed in a wind.

Sail or SAIL may also refer to:

Derived from the traditional meaning of sail
 Windmill sail, the wind-catching panel or cloth section that provides power to a windmill
 Sail (hieroglyph), an Egyptian language determinative
 Sail (submarine), the tower-like structure on the topside of submarines
 Sail (anatomy), a fin-like extension from the back of some animals

Acronyms
SAIL (cable system) (South Atlantic Inter Link), a submarine cable connecting Cameroon to Brazil
 Stanford Artificial Intelligence Laboratory
 SAIL programming language, created at Stanford Artificial Intelligence Laboratory
 Shuttle Avionics Integration Laboratory, a facility at Lyndon B. Johnson Space Center in Houston, Texas
 Steel Authority of India Limited (SAIL), India's largest steel maker
 RDF4J's Storage and Inference Layer, RDF4J's database implementation, home to RDF repositories

Places
 Sail, Pekanbaru, an administrative district of Pekanbaru, Riau, Indonesia
 SAIL High School, a public high school in Tallahassee, Florida
 Sail (Lake District), a hill in the English Lake District

Other
 Sail (letter), a letter of the Ogham alphabet
 "A Sail", a poem by Mikhail Lermontov
 Sail (novel), a 2008 mystery novel by James Patterson
 Sails (album), an album by Chet Atkins
 "Sails" (song), a 1969 song by Elton John
 "Sail" (song), a 2011 song by Awolnation
 Chevrolet Sail, a hatchback car
 SAIL Amsterdam, nautical event
 Sails.js, a web framework for the node.js runtime environment.

See also 
 Sale (disambiguation)
 Solar sail